The 48th government of Turkey (23 June 1991 – 20 November 1991) was a government led by  Mesut Yılmaz of Motherland Party (ANAP).

Background 
ANAP had the majority of seats in the parliament, but after Turgut Özal was elected as the president of Turkey, his prime minister post was offered to Yıldırım Akbulut. However, after the congress of the party, Mesut Yılmaz was elected as the new chairman of the party and was consequently appointed as the prime minister.

The government
In the list below, the serving period of cabinet members who served only a part of the cabinet's lifespan are shown in the column "Notes". According to Turkish constitution some members of the government were replaced by independent members before the elections.

Aftermath
The government ended because of the elections held on 20 October 1991.

References

Cabinets of Turkey
Motherland Party (Turkey) politicians
1991 establishments in Turkey
1991 disestablishments in Turkey
Cabinets established in 1991
Cabinets disestablished in 1991
Members of the 48th government of Turkey
18th parliament of Turkey
Motherland Party (Turkey)